West Halton railway station was a station in West Halton, Lincolnshire. The station was built by the North Lindsey Light Railway on its line from Scunthorpe (Dawes Lane) railway station to Whitton in north Lincolnshire. The station closed on 13 July 1925.

References

Disused railway stations in the Borough of North Lincolnshire
Former Great Central Railway stations
Railway stations in Great Britain opened in 1906
Railway stations in Great Britain closed in 1925